The Express 37 is an American light displacement sailboat designed by Carl Schumacher as a racer-cruiser.

Production
The design was built by Alsberg Brothers Boatworks in Santa Cruz, California from 1984 to 1988, but is now out of production. A total of 65 were completed.

Design
The Express 37 is a recreational keelboat, built predominantly of fiberglass, with wood trim. It has a masthead sloop rig, a raked stem, a reverse transom, an internally mounted spade-type rudder controlled by a tiller and a fixed fin keel. It displaces  and carries  of lead ballast.

The later Mk II version has a taller rig, an updated keel and rudder and a more cruising oriented interior. Only ten were built in this configuration.

Operational history
The Express 37 finished first, second and third in its debut at the 1985 Transpacific Yacht Race.

In a 2005 used boat review in Sailing Magazine, writer John Kretschmer concluded of the design, "The Express 37 offers exhilarating performance both on and off the racecourse. And although one-design fleets are shrinking, most 37s have a lot of speed left in them. Also, following the trend of their boats, as racing sailors get older and migrate toward more casual sailing, a logical decision might be to convert a 37 into more of a cruising boat."

Marine surveyor and naval architect, Jack Hornor described the design in a 2007 review, "the Express 37 will appeal to sailors interested in racing more than the dedicated cruiser; although, there is no reason these mid-1980s models can’t serve double duty for prospective buyers looking for a reasonably priced, solidly constructed racer/cruiser...Although contemporary in appearance, Schumacher’s respect for the beauty of traditional, well balanced boats is apparent in this design."

See also
List of sailing boat types

Related development
Express 27
Express 34

Similar sailboats
Alberg 37
Baltic 37
C&C 37
Dickerson 37
Dockrell 37
Endeavour 37
Hunter 36-2
Nor'Sea 37
Tayana 37

References

Sailing yachts
1980s sailboat type designs
Keelboats
Sailboat type designs by Carl Schumacher
Sailboat types built by Alsberg Brothers Boatworks